The , also referred to as the Tama Monorail, is a monorail system in Western Tokyo.

Operated by the Tokyo Tama Intercity Monorail Co., Ltd., the double tracked,  monorail line carries passengers between the suburban cities of Higashiyamato and Tama via Tachikawa, Hino, and Hachiōji in 36 minutes. 

Stations 
All stations located in Tokyo. Most stations have an associated shape/image (as seen in the left-most column of the table below).

History 
The line opened in two phases. The section from Kamikitadai to Tachikawa-Kita opened in November 1998 while the section south to Tama-Center opened in January 2000.

Station numbering was introduced to all stations in February 2018.

Future plans 
As of October 2022, there are plans to extend the route. One route is an extension north from the current terminus at Kamikitadai to Hakonegasaki Station on the Hachiko Line. The other two are southbound extensions from Tama-Center to Hachioji and Machida respectively.

Kamikitadai to Hakonegasaki 
In 2016, a proposal was made to extend the line from the current northern terminus at Kamikitadai Station to Hakonegasaki Station on the Hachikō Line. The planned extension to Hakonegasaki had been considered since planning for the entire route began in 1981.

Tama-Center to Hachioji 
A southward expansion of the monorail line to Hachiōji Station was also considered since the planning phase of the line in the 1980s. The expansion had also been considered to be run as a separate light rail transit line, but was ultimately abandoned in December 2016 citing topographical and technological constraints.

Tama-Center to Machida 
An extension from Tama-Center to Machida Station has also been considered since the planning phase of the line in the 1980s. As of January 2022, the exact route remains undecided. The most recent estimate determined that the construction would cost .

See also 
 Monorails in Japan
 List of rapid transit systems

References

External links 

  

  

Monorails in Japan
Railway lines in Tokyo
Tama Toshi Monorail
Western Tokyo
Railway lines opened in 1998
Japanese third-sector railway lines
Monorails

https://www.tama-monorail.co.jp.e.afy.hp.transer.com